Harry Havelock Williamson (August 19, 1916 – August 24, 1972) was a prospector and political figure in New Brunswick, Canada. He represented Gloucester County and then Bathurst in the Legislative Assembly of New Brunswick as a Liberal from 1960 to 1972.

He was born in Bathurst, New Brunswick, the son of Douglas R. Williamson and Ethel Mary Rennie. Williamson was educated at Sacred Heart University. In 1936, he married Alice M. Brown. He was involved in the lumber and mining industries. Williamson served as a captain in the Canadian Army during World War II and in Germany from 1951 to 1953. He was named speaker for the provincial assembly in 1966. Williamson served in the province's Executive Council as Minister of Labour from 1967 to 1970 and then as Minister of Economic Growth in 1970.  He died in office in 1972.

References 

 Canadian Parliamentary Guide, 1967, PG Normandin

1916 births
1972 deaths
New Brunswick Liberal Association MLAs
People from Bathurst, New Brunswick
Speakers of the Legislative Assembly of New Brunswick